Denis Aleksandrovich Shevelev (born 18 June 1981) is a former Russian professional footballer.

External links
 
 

1981 births
Living people
Russian footballers
Association football defenders
FC Zvezda Irkutsk players
FC Orenburg players
FC Dnepr Mogilev players
FC Dynamo Stavropol players
FC Gornyak Uchaly players
FC Tyumen players
FC Novokuznetsk players
Belarusian Premier League players
Russian expatriate footballers
Expatriate footballers in Belarus
FC Mashuk-KMV Pyatigorsk players